This is a list of the National Register of Historic Places listings in Polk County, Texas.

This is intended to be a complete list of properties listed on the National Register of Historic Places in Polk County, Texas. There are two properties listed on the National Register in the county. One property contains State Antiquities Landmarks of which one is also a Recorded Texas Historic Landmark.

Current listings

The locations of National Register properties may be seen in a mapping service provided.

|}

See also

National Register of Historic Places listings in Texas
Recorded Texas Historic Landmarks in Polk County

References

External links

Polk County, Texas
Polk County
Buildings and structures in Polk County, Texas